Robert Flynn Johnson is a specialist in anonymous images.

Selected publications
 The Power of Light: Daguerreotypes from the Robert Harshorn Shimshak Collection. Achenbach Foundation for Graphic Arts, San Francisco, 1986. 
 Artists' Books in the Modern Era 1870-2000. Thames & Hudson, 2002.
 Anonymous: Enigmatic Images from Unknown Photographers. Thames & Hudson, 2004. 
 The Face in the Lens Anonymous Photographs. University of California Press, 2009. 
 Working Girls: An American Brothel, circa 1892. The Secret Photographs of William Goldman. Glitterati Editions, New York, 2018. 
 Plant Kingdoms: The Photographs of Charles Jones
 Peter Milton Etchings: Complete Prints 1960-1996
 Norman Lundin: A Decade of Drawing and Painting

See also
 William Goldman

References

External links 
Collecting Art - Robert Flynn Johnson at Petaluma Art Center

Living people
American art curators
American non-fiction writers
Year of birth missing (living people)
American collectors
Historians of photography